Kani Sib may refer to:
 Kani Sib, Alut, Baneh County, Kurdistan Province
 Kani Sib, Namshir, Baneh County, Kurdistan Province
 Kani Sib, Mahabad, West Azerbaijan Province
 Kani Sib, Piranshahr, West Azerbaijan Province
 Kani Sib, Sardasht, West Azerbaijan Province